Kurang is a small village]in the Ratnagiri district of Maharashtra  in India. Ratnagiri is a coastal district on the Arabian Seafront.

Geography
The landmass on the western part of Maharashtra along the Arabian Sea, sandwiched between the sea and a mountain range named Sahyadri, is known as Konkan.  Kurang is situated at the foothills of Sahyadri mountains. A seasonal river named 'Naveri' runs through the hilly landscape.

With its evergreen vegetation and hilly landscape, it is pristine in the months of monsoon and after.

Demographics
Kurang has a small population because the majority of the people there have migrated to Mumbai the biggest city of India.  However, their attachment to their native place brings them back every summer and during the Ganapati festivals.

Transport

Public transport to Kurang is from Lanja, a tehsil town and from Rajapur, another tehsil in the vicinity. Six State Transport (ST) of Maharashtra buses ply during the day.  One can avail auto rickshaws and other private vehicles like the jeeps for the purpose. Kolhapur city is just about 80 kilometers and can be approached by Anuskura Ghat section which lies in another village in the vicinity. Ratnagiri city is about 87 kilometers from the village and a regular State Transport bus ply between the village and city.  Kurang is surrounded by Zarye, Parule of Rajapur Taluka and Kondge, Hardkhale of Lanja Taluka, on the east side Sahyadri ranges separate it from Shahuwadi Taluka of Kolhapur district.

Drive way from Mumbai is on National Highway 17 (NH17) across Lanja town and a left turn from Watul village takes you on state highway towards Kurang. Vilavade is the nearest railway station on Konkan Railway route, from where one has to take a private vehicle for another 20 km journey towards Kurang.

Economy

Agriculture and related businesses are prominent with the residents. Horticulture is catching up.  This region can grow good quality Alphanso Mangos and cashew nuts.  Good quality teakwood is also planted en masse.

There are two primary schools in the village; for secondary school, children have to walk about five kilometers in a neighboring village. Education is in Marathi language.

From here you can visit the Vishalgad/Vishalgarh by trekking your way through the forest and Sahyadris which was under the reign of Surve Dynasty of Kumbharkani.

Electricity, telephones, and piped drinking water are the few developments in last 10–15 years.  A few grocery shops are there to serve the needs of the locals.  Cellphone network is not available.

The language spoken here is Marathi, though some can understand Hindi and English.

Cultural

As with a typical Indian village, there are goddesses, Kurangadevi and Dev Rameshwar, as village deities.  Kurangadevi is ritually consulted on every major aspect.  Rameshwar Temple has as a major event, a fair, in the month of February on the day of Shivratri.

Major festivals are Ganapati Utsav, Dahikala, Holi or Shimga, Navratra, Diwali, and Shivaratri; Ganapati Utsav is biggest of all of them.  People visit their native village during Ganapati festival and is celebrated with gusto. Other major festival is Holi and is known better as Shimga locally.

References

External links 

Ratnagiri District
Sahyadri Mountain Range

Villages in Ratnagiri district